Straight Right is an Australian independent video game developer located in Melbourne, Australia. They are specializing in porting games made by other developers to various platforms.

History
Straight Right's first title, Shift 2: Unleashed, was developed for iOS, publisher by Electronic Arts and released on 4 August 2011. It received mixed, but mostly positive reviews.

Their next title was the Wii U version of Mass Effect 3: Special Edition, also published by Electronic Arts, which received critical acclaim, scoring 85 out of 100 on review site aggregator Metacritic, was released on 13 November 2012 in North America.

On 20 March 2013, it was announced by Square Enix that the developer will be responsible for Deus Ex: Human Revolution Director's Cut. It received critical acclaim for its improvements to the original game and usage of the GamePad, scoring 88 out of 100 on Metacritic.

Their most recent project is porting and programming the PlayStation 4, Xbox One and Microsoft Windows versions of ZombiU, retitled Zombi, which was originally developed by Ubisoft Montpellier and publisher by Ubisoft. It received mixed reviews.

Games

References

External links

Companies based in Melbourne
Video game companies established in 2011
Australian companies established in 2011
Privately held companies of Australia
Video game companies of Australia
Video game development companies